Syed Abdul Rahim (17 August 1909 – 11 June 1963), popularly known as Rahim Saab, was an Indian football coach and manager of the India national team from 1950 until his death in 1963, and a former player. He is regarded as the architect of modern Indian football. Basically a teacher by profession, he was a good motivator and his tenure as a coach is regarded as a "golden age" of football in India.

Under his stewardship, the India national team were renowned for their technical qualities and tactical innovations. They went on to win Gold medals in Asian Games of—(1951-Delhi and 1962-Jakarta), play semi-finals of the Summer Olympics—(1956-Melbourne) making India the first ever Asian country to achieve this place, win the titles of Colombo Cup for the years of—(1952-Colombo and 1954-Calcutta and came runners-up in Pestabola Merdeka—(1959 Kuala Lumpur).

Playing career
Rahim was born on 17 August 1909 in Hyderabad, British India. In his early years, he was a school teacher. After taking football seriously in his life, Rahim represented the football team of Osmania University, from where he did his graduation and played for a team "Eleven Hunters" that was made up of current and former students of the college.

After his journey as a teacher, Rahim returned to the college to complete his arts degree. Thereafter, he worked as the teacher successively in Kachiguda Middle School, Urdu Sharif School, Darul-ul-Uloom High School and Chaderghat High School. He then took a diploma in physical education and took charge of sports activities in the last two schools he served as teacher.

Rahim was a professional footballer for a while, as he had represented Qamar Club, which was then considered to be one of the best teams in the local league. Rahim also played for the Dutch Amateur League club HSV Hoek in the Nederlands, before going on to become a manager.

Managerial career

Hyderabad City Police
In 1943, Rahim was elected as secretary of the Hyderabad Football Association, and later became secretary of Andhra Pradesh Football Association. Thus, he became involved in developing the infrastructure of the game in Hyderabad and Secunderabad. Rahim then joined Hyderabad City Police FC as coach, and succeeded Norbert Andrew Fruvall for the post. He managed the team from 1950 until his death in 1963. The Hyderabadi club won five consecutive Rovers Cups during his tenure from 1950 to 1955. He also taken his team to five Durand Cup finals, winning three of them. One of the finest players of that team, Muhammad Noor, recalled the training session years under Rahim as: "Often at practice we had just one football and for refreshments afterwards just a cup of tea but our hard practice, a will to succeed and excellent coaching from the late Rahim Saheb enabled us to become a successful team".

Hyderabad
Rahim managed Hyderabad football team in Santosh Trophy, known as the senior national championships. He guided the team clinching two consecutive titles in 1956–57 and 1957–58, defeating the same team, Bombay, in finals. At the 1958–59 edition, Hyderabad were on the verge of a hat-trick of Santosh Trophy titles in Madras, but went down 5–2 to Services in quarter-finals. Most of the members of his Hyderabad City Police team, represented Hyderabad in the tournament.

India

He became manager of the India national football team in 1950, the same year, India had not gone to the 1950 FIFA World Cup in Brazil. Rahim's first assignment as the coach of India was to train the team that toured Ceylon in 1949. Rahim made the Indian team prominent during the "golden era" of Indian football, became one of the best teams in Asia. In March 1951, at the inaugural 1951 Asian Games in New Delhi, Rahim helped India winning the gold medal. They defeated Iran 1–0 in the gold medal match to gain their first trophy, as Sheoo Mewalal finished the tournament as top scorer.

During Rahim's tenure, the Indian football team enjoyed a great deal of success. Apart from winning the Asian games in 1951 and 1962, India also reached the semi-finals of the 1956 Melbourne Olympics which is still considered India's greatest ever achievement in football. Under his coaching at that tournament, players like Neville D'Souza, Samar Banerjee, P. K. Banerjee, J. Krishnaswamy achieved fame worldwide. At the 1960 Summer Olympics in Rome, India lost to Hungary 2–1 in their first game, with Balaram scoring the consolation goal in the 79th minute. India almost upset 1958 FIFA World Cup semi-finalists France few days later, in which Balaram's goal gave the lead to India but a mistake from Ram Bahadur Thapa denied India a famous victory.

Rahim's last success was at the 1962 Asian games in Jakarta, where India won gold, beating South Korea in the finals in front of a crowd of 100,000. He is also credited for bringing up and nurturing Indian talents during his tenure, including Peter Thangaraj, Nikhil Nandy, Kesto Pal, Chuni Goswami, Jarnail Singh, Tulsidas Balaram, Sheikh Abdul Latif, Mariappa Kempaiah, Dharmalingam Kannan, Hussain Ahmed, Mohammed Rahmatullah, Yousuf Khan, Nikhil Nandy, and Amal Dutta. Rahim was succeeded by English coach Harry Wright in 1964, who led the side to the runners-up spot in the 1964 Asian Cup.

Tactics and style

Rahim is considered to be the greatest coach India has ever produced. His tenure is considered as a "Golden age" of Indian football. Rahim was a teacher in his early career and coached Hyderabad City Police FC, which made him a strict disciplinarian and a good tactician, utilising the available resources he make best out of it, in the process to improve one-touch play he conducted non-dribbling and weaker leg-(the players supposedly play with their weaker foot) tournaments. 
Rahim introduced the classic 4–2–4 formation in Indian football team much before Brazil popularised it in the 1958 World Cup.

The 1962 Asian Games was Rahim's final major tournament, winning a 2–0 victory over South Korea. Before that final, he just said to his players, "Kal aap logon se mujhe ek tohfa chahiye....kal aap sona jitlo".

When Indian national coach Alberto Fernando had gone to a workshop in Brazil in 1964, he said: What I learnt from Rahim in 1956 is being taught now in Brazil. Verily, he was a football prophet.

Former Indian international Mohammed Zulfiqaruddin said about Rahim, as: He was a master at work. He made the Indian football team a formidable unit. He had the uncanny ability of spotting talent and turning them into solid players. But he was a strict disciplinarian.

Personal life 
Rahim's son, Syed Shahid Hakim was a former professional football player, who represented India at the 1960 Summer Olympics. Hakim also worked as FIFA official, squadron leader of IAF, and referee, later managed the national team like his father, and recipient of the Dhyan Chand Award.

Death
Rahim died from cancer on 11 June 1963 after being bed-ridden for six months.

Legacy

A former Indian football player Fortunato Franco said about "Rahim Saab";
With him he took Indian Football to the grave.

In memory of Rahim, the I-League "Best Coach Award" is renamed as "Syed Abdul Rahim Award", given to the best coach in each season by the All India Football Federation (AIFF).

In popular culture
A biopic on Rahim named Maidaan, directed by Amit Ravindernath Sharma, was scheduled to be released on 15 June 2022 with Ajay Devgn in lead role, but was delayed due to impending post-production works. Later, it was announced that the film is scheduled for theatrical release on 17 February 2023.

Honours

Managerial
Hyderabad City Police
Durand Cup: 1950–51, 1954, 1957–58, 1961; runner-up: 1952, 1956–57
Rovers Cup: 1950, 1951, 1952, 1953, 1954, 1957, 1960, 1962
DCM Trophy: 1959

India
Asian Games Gold Medal: 1951, 1962
Colombo Cup: 1952, 1954
Merdeka Cup runners-up: 1959

Hyderabad
Santosh Trophy: 1956–57, 1957–58

See also

 List of Indian football players in foreign leagues
 List of India national football team managers
 History of the India national football team
 History of Indian football

References

Bibliography

Further reading

External links

 Legends of Indian Football: Rahim Saab
106th birth anniversary, a look back at the genius that was Syed Abdul Rahim. (archived; Indian Football Team)

1909 births
1963 deaths
Footballers from Hyderabad, India
Indian footballers
Indian expatriate footballers
20th-century Indian Muslims
India national football team managers
Indian football coaches
Indian football managers
Asian Games competitors for India
Association footballers not categorized by position